Himiko (ひみこ; 卑弥呼) was a 3rd-century ruler of Yamataikoku, a kingdom in Japan.

Himiko may also refer to:

People and characters
 Himiko Kikuchi,(菊池 ひみこ) (born 1953) Japanese jazz pianist

Fictional characters
 Himiko Kudo or Himiko Kudou, a character in the anime/manga series GetBackers
 Himiko Toga, a character in the anime/manga series My Hero Academia
 Himiko Yumeno, a character in the video game Danganronpa V3: Killing Harmony

Places
 Himiko (Lyman-alpha blob), in astronomy, a Lyman-alpha blob at red-shift z=6.6

Arts and entertainment
 Himiko (film), a 1974 Japanese film
 House of Himiko, a 2005 Japanese film
 Legend of Himiko, an anime/manga series and computer game

Other uses
 Mitsuoka Himiko, a type of automobile

See also

 
 
 Hime (ひめ)

Japanese feminine given names